The Territorial Prelature  of Batanes (in ) is a Latin rite pre-diocesan, non-missionary jurisdiction of the Roman Catholic Church. It is a suffragan in the ecclesiastical province of the Roman Catholic Archdiocese of Tuguegarao on Luzon island in the Philippines.
 
The Our Lady of the Immaculate Conception Cathedral is the episcopal seat of the territorial prelate, in Basco, Batanes. The current bishop-prelate is Danilo B. Ulep.

Statistics and territory 
As per 2014, it pastorally served 16,647 Catholics (94.5% of 17,609 total) on 784 km² in 6 parishes and 1 mission with 9 priests (diocesan), 4 lay religious (4 sisters), 2 seminarians.

The prelature includes Batanes province and the municipality of Calayan in Cagayan Province. The territory is divided into six parishes. In 2004 there were 15,505 baptized about 16,476 inhabitants.

History 
The prelature was erected on 30 November 1950 as Territorial Prelature of Batanes Islands and Babuyan / Batanen(sis) et Babuyanen(sis) (Latin), on territory split off from the Metropolitan Archdiocese of Manila. On 29 June 1951 it became part of the ecclesiastical province of Archdiocese of Nueva Segovia. It became suffragan of the Archdiocese of Tuguegarao, its mother see on 21 September 1974. On 6 February 2002 renamed Territorial Prelature of Batanes / Batanen(sis) (Latin adjective).

Coat of arms
The silver crescent symbolizes the Immaculate Conception, the titular of the principal church in the prelature. The North Star together with the constellation of the Ursa major denotes that the prelature covers the northern-most part of the Philippines. Cattle is the most important export product of Batanes and Babuyan Islands hence the bull on pasture. The agitated sea symbolizes the dangerous waters between these islands.

Episcopal ordinaries
(all Roman Rite)

Prelates of Batanes and the Babuyan Islands 

Prelates of Batanes

See also 
Catholic Church in the Philippines
List of Catholic dioceses in the Philippines

References

Sources and external links 
 GCatholic.org
 Catholic Hierarchy
 Prelature website 

Roman Catholic dioceses in the Philippines
Territorial prelatures
Roman Catholic Ecclesiastical Province of Tuguegarao
Religion in Batanes
Christian organizations established in 1951
Roman Catholic dioceses and prelatures established in the 20th century
Christian organizations established in 1950
1951 establishments in the Philippines